The 2019 Trofeo Faip–Perrel was a professional tennis tournament played on hard courts. It was the fourteenth edition of the tournament which was part of the 2019 ATP Challenger Tour. It took place in Bergamo, Italy between 18 and 24 February 2019.

Singles main-draw entrants

Seeds

 1 Rankings were as of 11 February 2019.

Other entrants
The following players received wildcards into the singles main draw:
  Liam Caruana
  Lorenzo Musetti
  Julian Ocleppo
  Jannik Sinner
  Giulio Zeppieri

The following player received entry into the singles main draw as an alternate:
  Andrea Vavassori

The following players received entry into the singles main draw using their ITF World Tennis Ranking:
  Javier Barranco Cosano
  Raúl Brancaccio
  Peter Heller
  Roman Safiullin

The following players received entry from the qualifying draw:
  Riccardo Bonadio
  Baptiste Crepatte

The following player received entry as a lucky loser:
  Federico Arnaboldi

Champions

Singles

 Jannik Sinner def.  Roberto Marcora 6–3, 6–1.

Doubles

 Laurynas Grigelis /  Zdeněk Kolář def.  Tomislav Brkić /  Dustin Brown 7–5, 7–6(9–7).

2019 ATP Challenger Tour
2019
2019 in Italian sport
February 2019 sports events in Italy